Artem Erkomaishvili  (26 October 1887 - 2 February 1967) was a Georgian traditional chanter. 

Erkomaishvili was named an Honored Art Worker of Georgia in 1951. In 1966 he recorded a selection of chants in the Shemokmedi style at the Tbilisi State Conservatory.  As he was the last surviving chanter practicing the tradition, he was recorded singing all three voices of the chants, which were then mixed together using overdubbing. 

The recordings are considered an invaluable document of the Shemokmedi style, as without them it would likely have been lost, chanting being prohibited during the Soviet era. Some of the recordings were remastered and released for sale in 2016.

References

1887 births
1967 deaths
20th-century male singers from Georgia (country)
People from Guria